La Fuga may refer to:

 La Fuga (2001 film), a 2001 Argentine film
 La fuga (1937 film), a 1937 Argentine film
 La fuga (1944 film), a 1944 Mexican film
 La fuga (1964 film), a 1964 Italian film
 La Fuga (band), a Spanish rock band

See also 
 Fuga (disambiguation)